Camille Corney (died 11 June 1952 in Tunis) was a French theatre director and stage actor. He was the manager of the Studio des Champs-Élysées.

Filmography 
 1933: Le Jugement de minuit by Alexander Esway and André Charlot
 1933: Une vie perdue by Raymond Rouleau
 1938: The Time of the Cherries by Jean-Paul Le Chanois

Theater

Director 
1928	L'Innocente by Henri-René Lenormand 
1929	Au clair de la lune by Jehan Bouvelet and Edgar Bradby 
1932	Le Paquebot Tenacity by Charles Vildrac 
1942	Les Dieux de la nuit by Charles de Peyret-Chappuis 
1943	Britannicus by Jean Racine 
1949	Andromaque by Jean Racine

Actor 
1924	Chacun sa vérité de Luigi Pirandello / directed by Charles Dullin
1925	George Dandin ou le Mari confondu by Molière / directed by Charles Dullin
1926	La Comédie du bonheur by Nikolai Evreinov / directed by Charles Dullin
1927	Mixture by Henri-René Lenormand / directed by Georges Pitoëff
1928	L'Innocente by Henri-René Lenormand / directed by Camille Corney
1928	La Maison des cœurs brisés by George Bernard Shaw / directed by Georges Pitoëff
1932	Dimanche by Claude Roger-Marx
1932	Le Paquebot Tenacity by Charles Vildrac / directed by Camille Corney
1951	Tapage nocturne by Marc-Gilbert Sauvajon / directed by Jean Wall
1951	Halte au destin by Jacques Chabannes / directed by Georges Douking

References

External links 
 
 Camille Corney sur les Archives du spectacle
 Camille Corney sur la Bibliothèque nationale de France

French theatre directors
French male film actors
1952 deaths